Savion Castro (born 1994) is an officer and member of Board of Education of the Madison Metropolitan School District, and is the youngest member to ever serve on the board.

Early life
Castro grew up in Madison, Wisconsin, and attended public schools and graduated from La Follette High School and the University of Wisconsin-Madison. In his early years, he struggled with a learning disability and his family struggled with homelessness, issues which often led to truancy and academic problems. In 6th grade he was selected to participate in a program, with support from Best Buy and the University of Wisconsin, designed to provide a pathway to college. In 2010 he met President Barack Obama during a stop in Madison. Four years later, in 2014, as a sophomore in college, Castro was singled out in a speech by First Lady Michelle Obama for his determination to succeed despite setbacks and hardship. A few months later he wrote about prison reform, offering Madison as an example, noting that "even the most 'progressive' of places are not immune from a criminal-justice system that is archaic, ineffective, and most of all, unjust."

First, Second amendment challenges
In 2017, Castro, a college senior at the time, made headlines for his outspoken opposition to efforts, driven both by the University of Wisconsin board of regents and several state lawmakers, that sought to punish students who protest or disrupt others' speech. In May, he testified to a capitol panel that legislation being proposed was unjust, saying, "We have the right to assert our humanity when it is questioned." During a news conference, Castro accused school leaders of "capitulating to a bunch of right-wing extremists." He said that such restrictions unfairly affect minority students. In an op-ed, Castro wrote, "Most African American students never forget their first time walking into a lecture hall filled with hundreds of students and being the only black face. It is a chilling and isolating feeling. The voices of people of color on campus are often discouraged, overlooked, and silenced." The bill, which passed later that year, followed a 2016 incident in which conservative columnist Ben Shapiro was shouted down during a campus visit.

In May 2019, Castro found himself at the center of news story that drew national attention over a handgun incident in the state capitol. While working as an aide to Shelia Stubbs, a Democratic state lawmaker, Castro was confronted by a Republican lawmaker who displayed a handgun in Stubbs' office. Castro asked the assemblyman, Shae Sortwell, to leave the office. Sortwell complied, but the confrontation ignited a debate about second amendment rights.

School board career
Castro was appointed in July 2019 to replace Mary Burke, a former executive of Trek bicycles, becoming the youngest member ever to serve on the Madison School Board. His appointment also meant that for the first time there were two African Americans sitting on the seven-member board. He told a local reporter that he would seek to build trust "with young parents of color who are moving here who hear that Madison is one of the worst places to raise a black family, that we have a commitment (and) that we are working on it.” 

Later that year, Castro drew national attention when he spoke out about an incident at West High School, where a security guard had been terminated for using prohibited language, a situation Castro called "incredibly frustrating."

In April 2020, he was formally elected to the seat, and currently serves as treasurer to the board.

References

External links
 MMSD Board of Education website

 1994 births
Living people
Politicians from Madison, Wisconsin
School board members in Wisconsin